Due to the shared history of the Republic of Ireland and Northern Ireland, there are many shared mass media outlets between them on the island of Ireland.

Newspaper 
In January 2005 Daily Ireland, which was somewhat supportive of Sinn Féin was launched. It contended (in line with its politics) to be an all-Ireland newspaper, however its sales were far stronger in Northern Ireland and Dublin than the rest of the island, and it closed in September 2006.

Television 
A significant amount of terrestrial transmission overspill exists between transmissions from north and south of the Irish border, with a large portion of the population of Northern Ireland currently able to receive digital terrestrial television broadcasts from the Republic, and many in the Border Region of the Republic and beyond able to receive UK Freeview transmissions.

Cross-border partnership
On 1 February 2010 Ireland's Minister for Communications Eamon Ryan signed an agreement with the UK Secretary of State for Culture, Media and Sport, Ben Bradshaw. This agreement will enable viewers within Northern Ireland to watch RTÉ One, RTÉ Two and TG4 on a free-to-air basis as of 2012. The agreement between both jurisdictions will also guarantee that viewers within the Republic of Ireland will be able to view BBC One Northern Ireland and BBC Two Northern Ireland on the Republic of Ireland's free-to-air service to debut in late 2010. A cross-border initiative has always been on the agenda for the Green Party in the Republic of Ireland. However it was later announced that a change has occurred such that BBC services are now to be offered in the Republic of Ireland on a 'paid for' basis and not the original free-to-air basis.

Following a broad range of technical work, the two governments have now agreed an effective way to provide for the continuing provision of TG4 by building a new, low power TV multiplex in Northern Ireland. In addition to carrying TG4, this multiplex, which will be part of the UK DTT system, will also carry RTÉ 1 and RTÉ 2.

This would be expected to increase coverage of these channels in Northern Ireland, to 90% of the population in Northern Ireland to receive their services on a free-to-air basis, either through overspill as before or via the new multiplex.

The existing analogue signals will be switched off on a co-ordinated basis in the Republic of Ireland and Northern Ireland at the end of 2012 and more work will to be done between then and now. Digital UK plans to keep Northern viewers abreast of compatible equipment in time for ASO switch to digital and know what sort of equipment viewers might need to receive these services.

Foreseen as part of the agreement between both governments is the establishment of a joint venture between RTÉ and TG4 to run the multiplex which will be licensed under the UK's Wireless Telegraphy Act 2006 by Ofcom at the request of the UK Government. This will be a not-for-profit company. In addition, the licensee will have to put out to competitive tender all the elements of the multiplex operation which are contestable and the multiplex will be operated on a not-for-profit and open book basis.

See also 
 Media of the Republic of Ireland
 Media of Northern Ireland

References 

 
Ireland
+Ireland